Baco is a lunar impact crater that lies in the rugged southern highlands on the near side of the Moon. The rim and inner wall has been eroded and worn by countless minor impacts since the original formation of the crater. As a result, any terraces have been worn smooth and the rim is overlaid by several tiny craterlets. The interior floor is nearly flat, with no characteristic central peak at the midpoint and no small craters of significance.

There are several minor craters located in the surrounding terrain, including the satellite craters Baco A just to the south and Baco B to the northwest. Further to the north is the crater Breislak, and equally distant to the northeast is Ideler. Further to the west is Cuvier, while Asclepi lies to the southeast.

Although this crater was named after the Englishman Roger Bacon, it was chosen by the German astronomer von Mädler. Hence the crater name became modified from Bacon to Baco.

Satellite craters
By convention these features are identified on lunar maps by placing the letter on the side of the crater midpoint that is closest to Baco.

References

External links
 

Impact craters on the Moon